The Australian Film Institute Award for Best Foreign Film was an award presented by the Australian Film Institute (AFI), for a film made outside of Australia in English or non-English language. It was handed out at the Australian Film Institute Awards (known commonly as the AFI Awards), which are now the AACTA Awards after the establishment of the Australian Academy of Cinema and Television Arts (AACTA), by the AFI. The Award was handed out from 1992–2004.

Winners and nominees
In the following table, films listed first in boldface and highlighted in gold are the winners. Those that are not in boldface or highlighted are the nominees.

See also
 AACTA Awards
 AACTA Award for Best Film
 AACTA International Award for Best Film

References

External links
The Australian Academy of Cinema and Television Arts Official website

F
Awards for best film